Ockert Antonie Roux (born 22 February 1947) is a former South African rugby union player.

Playing career
Roux represented  schools in 1964 and played his senior provincial rugby in South Africa for Northern Transvaal.

He made his test debut for the Springboks during the South African tour of Britain and Ireland in 1969 and 1970. His first test match was against  at Murrayfield in Edinburgh, playing at centre. He played ss a centre in all three other tests on the tour and also against  in 1972. He was then selected at fullback for two tests against the British Lions in 1974. Roux was an unused bench replacement a further 13 times in test matches and played in twenty-four tour matches, scoring fifteen points for the Springboks.

Test history

See also
List of South Africa national rugby union players – Springbok no. 426

References

1947 births
Living people
South African rugby union players
South Africa international rugby union players
Blue Bulls players
University of Pretoria alumni
Rugby union players from Pretoria
Rugby union centres
Rugby union fullbacks